Boledehi (بلیده ای:Baluchi) is a term referring to a group of khans and sardars in southern Balochistan, Sarbaz and Chah Bahar provinces of South West Asia. 

For centuries, Boledehies were the Hakims (princes) of Dashtyari, Bahu and Rask. Their Hakimate in Bahu collapsed due to emigration and the attack of  a Sindhi aboriginal tribe known as the sardarzahi (or saddazahi), but they remained as influential hakims in Sarbaz and Nikshahr.

References and further reading
 (In Persian): Chabahar va Daryaei Pars, Iraj Afshar Sistani, Siddiqi Publication, Zahedan, pages 267, 268, 271
 Philip Carl Salzman, Politics and Change among the Baluch in Iran, June 20, 2008: http://blogs.law.harvard.edu/mesh/papers/

Geography of Iran
Sistan and Baluchestan Province
Baloch people